An administrative district of Serbia is the country's first-level administrative division. It can be translated as "county", though it is generally rendered by the Serbian government as "district". Prior to a 2006 decree, the administrative districts were named simply districts.

The Serbian local government reforms of 1992, going into effect the following year, created 29 districts, with the City of Belgrade having similar status. Following the 2008 Kosovo declaration of independence, the districts created by the UNMIK-Administration were adopted by Kosovo. The Serbian government does not recognize these districts.

The districts of Serbia are generally named after historical and geographical regions, though some, such as the Pčinja District and the Nišava District, are named after local rivers. Their areas and populations vary, ranging from the relatively-small Podunavlje District to the much larger Zlatibor District.

As they are mere designations of territorial remit of regional administrative centres through which the central government exercises its power within a hierarchical order, the districts are distinctly not units of regional self-governance, and as such they do not have flags. Still, they are each run by a commissioner as well as cooperating municipal leaders. Rather than being further divisible into municipalities, each district overlaps with its corresponding cluster of municipalities (which are units of local self-governance).

Definition
Administrative districts were first defined by the Government of Serbia's Decree of 29 January 1992, which specifies that Ministries and other national-level agencies shall conduct their affairs outside their headquarters (i.e. outside the seat of government) via regional offices that they may establish per the designated clusters of municipalities (named only "districts"), also designating the administrative seat of each district ("regional center of state administration"). The 2005 Law on Public Administration provided a legal definition of a district, under the term "administrative district".

In 2006, the Government enacted the Decree on Administrative Districts, which renamed the districts into administrative districts.

The territorial organisation of Serbia is regulated by the Law on Territorial Organization, adopted by the National Assembly on 29 December 2007. According to the Law, the territorial organization of the republic comprises municipalities and cities, the City of Belgrade with special status, and autonomous provinces. Districts are not mentioned in this law.

List of districts
Serbia is divided into 29 districts (8 in Šumadija and Western Serbia, 9 in Southern and Eastern Serbia, 7 in Vojvodina and 5 in Kosovo and Metohija), plus the City of Belgrade. The City of Belgrade is not part of any district, but has a special status very similar to that of a district.

Šumadija and Western Serbia

Southern and Eastern Serbia

Vojvodina

Kosovo

Serbian laws treat Kosovo as integral part of Serbia (Autonomous Province of Kosovo and Metohija). The 1992 Decree defines five districts on the territory of Kosovo. But, from 1999, following the Kosovo War, Kosovo was governed under the United Nations' administration of UNMIK. In 2000, the UNMIK administration changed the territorial organisation on the territory of Kosovo. All five districts were abolished, and seven new districts were created, which were later adopted by Kosovo after the 2008 declaration of Independence. The Serbian government does not recognize this move, and claims the pre-2000 five districts as following:

See also
Administrative divisions of Serbia
Municipalities and cities of Serbia
Cities and towns of Serbia
Cities, towns and villages of Vojvodina
Populated places of Serbia
Districts of Kosovo
ISO 3166-2:RS

Notes and references

Notes

References

Sources

External links

 
Subdivisions of Serbia
Serbia 1
Serbia 1
Districts, Serbia
Serbia geography-related lists